The siege of Deventer was a siege of the city of Deventer by States troops under George van Lalaing, count of Rennenberg, from 3 August to 19 November 1578 during the Eighty Years' War. It was besieged in an attempt by the States-General of the Netherlands to better protect the regions of Holland and Utrecht from Spanish plundering. Since 1572 the city had been held by the German Polweiler-regiment for the Spanish Empire on behalf of Don John of Austria. After Lalaing had put into practice a number of pieces of strategic advice from Johan van den Kornput, the city was prepared to negotiate a surrender and on 19 November 1578 handed itself over to States troops.

Deventer
1578 in the Dutch Republic
1578 in the Habsburg Netherlands
16th-century military history of Spain
Eighty Years' War (1566–1609)
Deventer (1578)
Deventer (1578)
Deventer (1578)
Deventer
History of Deventer